Iskra is a rural locality (a selo) in Leninskoye Rural Settlement, Nikolayevsky District, Volgograd Oblast, Russia. The population was 189 as of 2010. There are 9 streets.

Geography 
Iskra is located on the left bank of the Volgograd Reservoir, 13 km northeast of Nikolayevsk (the district's administrative centre) by road. Leninskoye is the nearest rural locality.

References 

Rural localities in Nikolayevsky District, Volgograd Oblast